In statistics, the graphical lasso is a sparse penalized maximum likelihood estimator for the concentration or precision matrix (inverse of covariance matrix) of a multivariate elliptical distribution. The original variant was formulated to solve Dempster's covariance selection problem for the multivariate Gaussian distribution when observations were limited. Subsequently, the optimization algorithms to solve this problem were improved and extended  to other types of estimators and distributions.

Setting 
Consider observations  from multivariate Gaussian distribution . We are interested in estimating the precision matrix .

The graphical lasso estimator is the  such that:

Application 
To obtain the estimator in programs, users could use the R package glasso, GraphicalLasso() class in the scikit-learn Python library, or the skggm Python package (similar to scikit-learn).

See also 
 Graphical model
 Lasso (statistics)

References 

Normal distribution
Graphical models
Markov networks